Manila FAME is a bi-annual trade show organized by the Center for International Trade Expositions and Missions (CITEM), the export promotions arm of the Philippine Department of Trade and Industry (DTI).

Launched in 1983, it is the second-longest running trade event on houseware, furnishings, gift items, holiday decor, and fashion accessories in the Asia-Pacific Region. It is the only show in the Philippines recognized by the Union des Foires Internationales, the union of the world's leading tradeshow organizers, fairground owners, and major national and international associations of the exhibitions industry.

The 67th edition will be held on April 19–21, 2018 at the World Trade Center in Pasay, Manila.

Manila FAME takes trade buyers and visitors to a journey of discovery that celebrates Philippine craftsmanship at its best. The trade fair showcases products and settings that are in keeping with modern trends.

Gallery

References

External links
Manila FAME
Center for International Trade Expositions and Missions (CITEM)

Trade fairs in the Philippines
Events in Metro Manila